Cymothoe euthalioides is a butterfly in the family Nymphalidae. It is found from Sierra Leone to Nigeria and in Cameroon.

Subspecies
Cymothoe euthalioides euthalioides (eastern Nigeria, Cameroon)
Cymothoe euthalioides albomarginata Neustetter, 1921 (Sierra Leone to western Nigeria)

References

Butterflies described in 1889
Cymothoe (butterfly)
Butterflies of Africa
Taxa named by William Forsell Kirby